Forged in Fury is the ninth studio album by Brazilian death metal band Krisiun. It was released on 7 August 2015 by Century Media Records and produced by Erik Rutan.

Track listing

Personnel
Krisiun
 Alex Camargo – bass, vocals
 Moyses Kolesne – guitar
 Max Kolesne – drums

Production and artwork
 Erik Rutan – production, recording, mixing, and mastering
 Joe Petagno – artwork
 Krisiun – production

References 

2015 albums
Krisiun albums
Century Media Records albums